"The Harder They Come" is a reggae song by the Jamaican singer Jimmy Cliff. It was first recorded for the soundtrack of the 1972 movie of the same name, in which it is supposed to have been written by the film's main character, Ivanhoe Martin.

"The Harder They Come" has been covered by many artists and was ranked number 350 on Rolling Stone magazine's list of "500 Greatest Songs of All Time".

Jimmy Cliff recording
In 1969, singer Jimmy Cliff met film director Perry Henzell, who was intending to make a film about a musician who turned to crime.  Cliff agreed to take the lead role, and the film was shot over the next two years.  During filming, Cliff came up with the line "the harder they come".  Henzell thought it would make a good title for the film, and asked Cliff to write and record a theme song for it.

The actual recording of the track, at Dynamic Sounds, was filmed for inclusion in the movie.  Cliff wrote the melody, and improvised the lyrics.  The musicians were Gladstone Anderson (piano), Winston Wright (organ), Winston Grennan (drums), Linford "Hux" Brown (lead guitar), Ranford "Ranny Bop" Williams (rhythm guitar), and Clifton "Jackie" Jackson (bass).

Joe Jackson version

Joe Jackson recorded "The Harder They Come" with his band and released it as a single in 1980. It did not chart in the UK.

Track listing

Chart performance

Rockers Revenge version

"The Harder They Come" was recorded by the group Rockers Revenge in 1983 after their successful cover version of the Eddy Grant song "Walking On Sunshine" the previous year. The single peaked at number 13 in the US Dance Chart and at number 30 in the UK and Irish Singles Chart.

Chart performance

Madness version

"The Harder They Come" was released as a single by English ska band Madness in November 1992 after a successful reunion concert held at London's Finsbury Park. The single was recorded live at the event along with its B-sides. Although in 1992 Madness had success with reissues of "It Must Be Love" and "My Girl", their version of "The Harder They Come" failed to make the top 40 in the UK Singles Chart, peaking at number 44.

Track listings

Charts

Other cover versions
"The Harder They Come" has also been covered by:
 Jerry Garcia Band, on After Midnight: Kean College, 2/28/80, released in 2004
 Merl Saunders / Jerry Garcia / John Kahn / Bill Vitt, on Live at Keystone (1973)
 Cher, entitled "The Bigger They Come, The Harder They Fall" on Stars (1975)
 Keith Richards, as the B-side to his single "Run Rudolph Run" (1978)
 Titãs released a version in Portuguese entitled "Querem Meu Sangue" ("They Want My Blood") on Titãs (1984). Cliff would then perform a medley version with them on the live album Acústico MTV (1997).
 Rancid, live on Tibetan Freedom Concert (1997)
 Kahimi Karie, on K.K.K.K.K. (1998)
 Joe Strummer and Long Beach Dub Allstars, on charity compilation Free the West Memphis 3 (2000)
 Joe Strummer & The Mescaleros, live on CD single "Coma Girl" (2003)
 Me First and the Gimme Gimmes, on Warped Tour 2003 Tour Compilation (2003)
 Wayne Kramer has released two slightly different versions of the song, on the 2000 compilation "Cocaine Blues" and the "Dodge Main" album, with Deniz Tek and Scott Morgan
 moe., on Warts and All: Volume 4 (2005)
 Willie Nelson, on Countryman (2005)
 Pat MacDonald, on Bridging the Distance: a Portland, OR covers compilation (2007)
 Guster, on the Everwood soundtrack
 Poison Idea, on Pyjama Party (1992)
 Widespread Panic - 7/27/01 - Oak Mountain Amphitheatre, Pelham, Alabama.

References

External links
 [ Review] of "The Harder They Come" by Jimmy Cliff at Allmusic

1972 singles
Jimmy Cliff songs
Joe Jackson (musician) songs
1992 singles
Madness (band) songs
Reggae songs
1980 singles
1972 songs
Island Records singles
A&M Records singles
London Records singles
Go! Discs singles
Songs written by Jimmy Cliff
Song recordings produced by Clive Langer
Song recordings produced by Alan Winstanley